Strabane Athletic Football Club is a Northern Irish, intermediate football club based in Strabane, County Tyrone, playing in the Northern Ireland Intermediate League. The club was elevated to intermediate standard, when it joined the Intermediate League for the 2012–13 season.

The club participates in the Irish Cup.

External links
 nifootball.co.uk - (For fixtures, results and tables of all Northern Ireland amateur football leagues)
  - Club Website

References

 

Association football clubs in Northern Ireland
Association football clubs in County Tyrone